The 1980 Chilean telethon, the third version of the Chilean Telethon, was conducted in Chile on 5 and 6 December 1980 . The theme was "Standing hope"and the symbolic boy was José Morales who died on November 8, 2010 due to a degenerative lesion of the nervous system.

The goal was to reach CL$ 138,728,450, which again was surpassed with a total of CL$ 176,420,628.

Sponsors

Artists 
Gianni Bella
Sergio y Estíbaliz

Transmission 
 12.10.3.8 TVUN Red del Norte
 UCV Televisión
 Televisión Nacional de Chile
 Teleonce Universidad de Chile
 Corporación de Televisión Universidad Católica de Chile

External links 

Teleton
Chilean telethons